This is a list of notable newspaper columnists. It does not include magazine or electronic columnists.

English-language

Australia
 Phillip Adams (born 1939), The Australian
 Piers Akerman (born 1950), The Daily Telegraph
 Janet Albrechtsen (born 1966), The Australian
 Andrew Bolt (born 1959), Herald Sun, Melbourne
 Leslie Cannold (born 1965), The Age Melbourne; The Sun Herald | Sydney; Crikey
 Mike Carlton (born 1946), The Sydney Morning Herald
 Nick Cater, The Australian
 Peta Credlin (born 1971), The Australian
 Henry Ergas, The Australian
 Elizabeth Farrelly, The Sydney Morning Herald
 Nikki Gemmell (born 1966), The Australian
 Robert Gottliebsen (born 1941), The Australian
 Sarah Holland-Batt (born 1982), The Australian
 Danny Katz (born 1960s), The Age Melbourne; The Sydney Morning Herald; The West Australian
 Gavin King (born 1979), The Cairns Post
 Bjørn Lomborg (born 1965), The Australian
 Brendan O'Neill, The Australian
 Bernard Salt, The Australian
 Niki Savva, The Age; The Sydney Morning Herald
 Judith Sloan (born 1954), The Australian

Canada

Living
 Barbara Amiel (born 1940), Toronto Sun, The Times, The Sunday Times, The Daily Telegraph
 Andrew Coyne (born 1960), Financial Post, National Post, The Globe and Mail, CanWest News Service
 John Doyle (born 1957), The Globe and Mail
 Gwynne Dyer (born 1943), self-syndicated
 David Frum (born 1960), National Post
 Robert Fulford (born 1932), National Post
 Marcus Gee The Globe and Mail
 Chantal Hébert (born 1954), Toronto Star
 Michele Landsberg (born 1935), Toronto Star
 Heather Mallick (born 1959), Toronto Sun, Toronto Star, The Globe and Mail
 Lawrence Martin (born 1948), The Globe and Mail
 Don Macpherson (1947), Montreal Gazette
 Rex Murphy (born 1947), The Globe and Mail, National Post
 Doug Saunders (born 1967), The Globe and Mail
 Jeffrey Simpson (born 1949), The Globe and Mail
 Mark Steyn (born 1959), The Spectator, The Daily Telegraph
 Ellie Tesher (born 1941), Toronto Star, Chicago Sun-Times
 Margaret Wente (born 1950), The Globe and Mail

Deceased

 Christie Blatchford (1951–2020), National Post
 Allan Fotheringham (1932–2020), The Globe and Mail, National Post, The Roughneck, Maclean's
 Peter Worthington (1927–2013), Toronto Telegram, Toronto Sun

Dominican Republic
 Geovanny Vicente (1986–), CNN, Infobae

France
 William Pfaff (1928–2015), International Herald Tribune

Ghana
 Cameron Duodu (1937–), Mail and Guardian, City Press (South Africa), Ghanaian Times
 Anis Haffar, Daily Graphic

India

 Bachi Karkaria
 Chetan Bhagat
 Swaminathan Aiyar
 Chidanand Rajghatta
 Gurcharan Das
 Harish Iyer
 Jug Suraiya
 Kaberi Gayen (1970–), The Daily Star, Prothom Alo
 M. J. Akbar
 Mrinal Chatterjee
 Rafiq Zakaria (1920–2005), The Times of India
 Rajdeep Sardesai
 Shobhaa De
 Soli Sorabjee
 Sunita Narain
 Swapan Dasgupta
 Tavleen Singh (1950–), The Indian Express

Ireland
 Eamon Delaney

Israel
 Dan Margalit (1938–), Haaretz

Pakistan
Hassan Nisar, Daily Jang
Saleem Safi, Daily Jang
Irfan Husain, Daily Dunya
Hamid Mir, Daily Jang
Rauf Klasra, Daily Dunya
Khurshid Ahmed Nadeem, Daily Duniya

Philippines
 Randy David (19??–), Philippine Daily Inquirer

Saint Vincent and the Grenadines 

 Kenneth John (1938–2021), The Vincentian

South Africa
 Jani Allan (1953–), Sunday Times

Trinidad and Tobago
 Marion O'Callaghan (1934–2016), Trinidad and Tobago Newsday
 Raoul Pantin (1943–2015), Trinidad Express
 Marina Salandy-Brown, Trinidad and Tobago Newsday

United Kingdom
 Barbara Amiel (1940–), Toronto Sun, The Times, Sunday Times, Daily Telegraph
 Bruce Anderson, The Independent
 Terence Blacker (1948–), The Independent
 Russell Brand (1975–), The Guardian
 Jeremy Clarkson (1960–), The Sunday Times and The Sun
 Robert Crampton (1964–), The Times
 Nigel Dempster (1941–2007), Daily Express, Daily Mail and Private Eye
 Tom Driberg (1905–1976), Daily Express and Reynolds News
 Tony Forrester (1953–), The Daily Telegraph and The Sunday Telegraph
 Jonathan Freedland (1967–), The Guardian, Jewish Chronicle, Daily Mirror, Evening Standard
 A. A. Gill (1954–2016), The Sunday Times
 Simon Heffer (1960–), Daily Mail, The Daily Telegraph
 Peter Hitchens (1951–), Daily Express, The Mail on Sunday
 Simon Jenkins (1943–), The Sunday Times, The Guardian, Evening Standard
 Bernard Levin (1928–2004), The Times
 Richard Littlejohn (1954–), The Sun and Daily Mail
 George Monbiot (1963–), The Guardian
 Matthew Parris (1949–), The Times
 David Rennie (1971–), Evening Standard, The Daily Telegraph, The Economist
 Joan Smith (1953–), The Independent on Sunday, The Guardian, The Telegraph
 Mark Steel (1960–), The Guardian, The Independent
 Jack Trevor Story (1917–1991), The Guardian
 Andrew Sullivan (1963–), The Sunday Times
 Tom Townsend (1971–), The Daily Telegraph
 Polly Toynbee (1946–), The Guardian, The Independent,
 Hugo Young (1937–2003), The Guardian''', 'The Sunday Times,

United States

A–L
 Mitch Albom (1958–), Detroit Free Press
 Mike Barnicle (1943–), Boston Herald
 Dave Barry (1947–), Miami Herald
 David Bianculli (19??–), Philadelphia Inquirer, New York Post, New York Daily News
 David Brooks (1961–), The New York Times
 Rosa Brooks (1970–), Los Angeles Times
 Pat Buchanan (1938–), Creators Syndicate
 Scott Burns, Universal Press Syndicate and Dallas Morning News
 Wilson Casey (1954–), Spartanburg, South Carolina Herald-Journal, King Features Weekly Syndicate
 Mona Charen (1957–), Creators Syndicate
 Richard Cohen, The Washington Post
 Gail Collins (1945–), The New York Times
 Ann Coulter (1961–), Universal Press Syndicate
 E. J. Dionne (1952–), The Washington Post
 Maureen Dowd (1952–), The New York Times
 Mike Downey (1951–), Los Angeles Times, Chicago Tribune
 Tina Dupuy (1978–), Cagle Cartoons
 Mike Freeman, The Indianapolis Star
 Thomas Friedman (1953–), The New York Times
 Jonah Goldberg (1969–), USA Today, Los Angeles Times, Tribune Media Services
 Ray Hanania (1953–), Daily Southtown, Chicago Sun-Times, Southwest News Newspaper Group, Arab News, The Jerusalem Post
 Victor Davis Hanson (1953–), Tribune Media Services
 Froma Harrop (1950–), Creators Syndicate
 Carolyn Hax (1966–), The Washington Post
 Carl Hiaasen (1943–), Miami Herald
 Jeff Jacoby (1969–), Boston Globe
 Avery Yale Kamila (197?–), Portland Press Herald
 Michael Kinsley (1951–), The Washington Post
 Nicholas Kristof (1959–), The New York Times
 Paul Krugman (1953–), The New York Times
 Al Lewis (1961–), Dow Jones Newswires
 Steve Lopez (1953–), Los Angeles Times

M–Z
 Charlie Madigan (1949–), Chicago Tribune
 Michelle Malkin (1970–), Los Angeles Daily News, Seattle Times, St. Louis Globe-Democrat, Creators Syndicate
 Tom Meek (1956–), Gainesville Sun
 Harold Meyerson (1950–), The Washington Post
 Jeffrey Morgan (19??–), Metro Times
 Patt Morrison, Los Angeles Times
 Clarence Page (1947–), Chicago Tribune
 Kathleen Parker (1952–), The Washington Post Writers Group
 Jeanne Phillips (Abigail van Buren or Dear Abby), (1942–), Universal Press Syndicate
 Leonard Pitts (1957–), Miami Herald
 Bill Plaschke (1958–), Los Angeles Times
 Dennis Prager (1948–), Creators Syndicate
 Ted Rall (1963–), San Francisco Chronicle Features, Universal Press Syndicate
 Michael Reagan (1945–), Cagle Cartoons
 Eugene Robinson (1954–), The Washington Post
 Neal Rubin (1955–), Detroit News
 Mary Schmich (1953–), Chicago Tribune
 Ben Shapiro (1984–), Patriot Post
 Kyle Smith (critic) (1966–), New York Post
 Thomas Sowell (1930–), Creators Syndicate
 Ellie Tesher (1941–), Toronto Star
 Cal Thomas (1942–), Tribune Media Services
 Peter Vecsey (1943–), New York Post
 Gene Weingarten (1951–), The Washington Post
 George Will (1941–), The Washington Post Writers Group
 Walter E. Williams (1936–2020), Creators Syndicate
 Craig Wilson, Saratogian, USA Today

Deceased
Listed chronologically by birth date
 John Neal (1793–1876), The Baltimore Telegraph
 Fanny Fern (1811–1872), New York Ledger
 Charlotte Reeve Conover (1855–1940), Dayton Daily News
 Harry Carr (1877–1936), Los Angeles Times
 Will Rogers (1879–1935), The New York Times, McNaught Syndicate
 E.V. Durling (1893–1957), King Features Syndicate
 O. O. McIntyre (1884–1938), Gallipolis Tribune, Bridgeport Post, New York Journal-American, Scripps-Howard, McNaught
 Lee Shippey (1884–1969), Kansas City Star, Los Angeles Times, San Diego Union, Del Mar Surfcomber
 Hedda Hopper (1885–1966), Los Angeles Times, Syndicated Columnist
 Walter Winchell (1897–1972), Vaudeville News, New York Evening Graphic, New York Daily Mirror
 Drew Pearson (1897–1969), The Washington Post
 Ward Morehouse (1899–1967), New York Sun
 Ed Sullivan (1901–1974), New York Evening Graphic, New York Daily News
 Lucius Beebe (1902–1966), San Francisco Examiner, New York Herald Tribune
 Matt Weinstock (1903–1970), Los Angeles Daily News, Los Angeles Times
 C.H. Garrigues (1903–1974), Los Angeles Illustrated Daily News, San Francisco Examiner
 Red Smith (1905–82), The New York Times
 Ruth Montgomery (1912–2001), Hearst Headline Service, United Press International
 Irv Kupcinet (1912–2003), Chicago Sun-Times
 Roz Young (1912–2005), Dayton Daily News
 Dorothy Kilgallen (1913–1965), New York Journal-American
 Marj Heyduck (1913–1969), Dayton Daily News
 Charles McCabe (1915–1983), San Francisco Chronicle
 Parke S. Rouse Jr. (1915–1997), Newport News, Daily Press
 Herb Caen (1916–1997), San Francisco Chronicle
 Sydney J. Harris (1917–1986), Chicago Daily News, Chicago Sun-Times
 Tom Braden (1917–2007)
 Sylvia Schur (1917–2009), PM
 Emmett Watson (1918–2001), Seattle Times, Seattle Post-Intelligencer
 Eppie Lederer (Ann Landers), (1918–2002), Chicago Sun-Times Pauline Phillips (Abigail van Buren or Dear Abby) (1918–2013), San Francisco Chronicle, McNaught Syndicate, Universal Press Syndicate
 Jim Murray (1919–1998), Los Angeles Times Andy Rooney (1919–2011), Tribune Media Services
 James Jackson Kilpatrick, (1920–2010), journalist, columnist, author, writer and grammarian
 Dick Kleiner (1921–2002), Newspaper Enterprise Association
 Army Archerd (1922–2009), Daily Variety Jack Anderson (1922–2005), Syndicated Columnist
 Al Neuharth (1924–2013), USA Today Art Buchwald (1925–2007), The Washington Post, International Herald-Tribune, Tribune Media Services
 Russell Baker (1925–2018), The New York Times Erma Bombeck (1927–1996), Dayton Journal Herald, Kettering-Oakwood Times, Newsday Newspaper Syndicate
 L. M. Boyd (1927–2007), Seattle Post-Intelligencer, San Francisco Chronicle, Crown Syndicate
 James Brady (1928–2009), New York Post, Advertising Age, Crain's New York Business Jimmy Breslin (1928–2017), New York Daily News, Long Island Newsday Herbert Lyle Mayfield (1929–2012), Greenville Advocate William Safire (1929–2009), The New York Times Robert Novak (1931–2009), "Inside Report", Chicago Sun-Times Mike Royko (1932–1997), Chicago Daily News, Chicago Sun-Times, Chicago Tribune Hunter S. Thompson (1937–2005), The Playground News, San Francisco Examiner, Rolling Stone Roger Ebert (1942–2013), Chicago Sun-Times Molly Ivins (1944–2007), Dallas Times-Herald, Fort Worth Star-Telegram, The New York Times, Creators Syndicate Lewis Grizzard (1946–1994), Atlanta Journal-Constitution Charles Krauthammer (1950–2018), The Washington Post Mike McAlary (1957–1998), New York Daily News French-language 

France
Raymond Aron (1905–1983), Le Figaro, L'ExpressAlain Rémond (1946–), Télérama, Marianne, La CroixItalian-language

Italy
 Lucia Annunziata (1950–), La Stampa Fiamma Nirenstein (1945–), Il Giornale Anna Maria Quaini or Mina Mazzini (1940–), La Stampa Beppe Severgnini (1956–), Corriere della Sera Marco Travaglio (1964–), La Republica, L'Unita, L'EspressoJapanese-language

Japan

 Debito Arudou (1965–), Japan Times and Japan Today Hugh Cortazzi (1924–2018), Japan Times Polish-language 

Poland
 Bolesław Prus (1847–1912), free-lance

Portuguese-language 

Brazil
 Luis Fernando Verissimo (1936–), A ilusao Arnaldo Jabor (1940–2022), PensadorPortugal
 Miguel Sousa Tavares (1952–), Expresso Ricardo de Araújo Pereira (1974–), Visão''

See also
 List of syndicated columnists

References

References are given within the articles themselves.

Columnists